Köthener See is a lake in Landkreis Dahme-Spreewald, Brandenburg, Germany. It lies at an elevation of 43 m, and has a surface area of 1.48 km². It is located in the municipality of Märkisch Buchholz, Dahme-Spreewald district.

External links

Lakes of Brandenburg
Dahme-Spreewald
LKothenerSee